is a major railway station in Chūō-ku, Niigata, Japan, operated by East Japan Railway Company (JR East). The station is at the centre of Niigata city, the largest city on the Sea of Japan coast in Honshu. It forms the central station for the railway infrastructure along the Sea of Japan coast, and is also the terminus of the Jōetsu Shinkansen high-speed line from Tokyo.

Lines
Niigata Station is served by the following lines.
 Joetsu Shinkansen
 Shin'etsu Main Line
 Hakushin Line
 Echigo Line

Station layout
The station has two side platforms (former 1, 4) and two island platforms (former 2/3, and 8/9) at ground level serving a total of six tracks for conventional narrow gauge lines, of which only one island platform remains in use for trains originating from Niigata Station. This island platform (8/9) is an extension of one of the side platforms (1). The station also has two elevated side platforms 2, 5) and one island platform 3,4) serving conventional narrow gauge lines, and two more elevated island platforms serving four shinkansen tracks (11 to 14).  The elevated station building has a "Midori no Madoguchi" staffed ticket counter and "View Plaza" travel agency.

Platforms

(Elevated)

(Ground level)

History
Niigata Station opened on 3 May 1904.  With the privatization of Japanese National Railways (JNR) on 1 April 1987, the station came under the control of JR East.

Passenger statistics
In fiscal 2017, the station was used by an average of  37,461 passengers daily (boarding passengers only). The passenger figures for previous years are as shown below.

Surrounding area
 CoCoLo Niigata, shopping center in the station
 Sake Museum Ponshu-kan

 Bandai Bridge

Bus terminals

Both the Bandai Entrance and the South Entrance have bus terminals. , the following transit bus line are on service.

Bandaiguchi Bus Terminal
 Niigata City Loop Bus
 Transit bus operated by Niigata Kotsu
 BRT "Bandai-bashi Line" : Niigata Sta.—Bandai Bridge—Furumachi—City office—Hakusan Station—Aoyama
 C* : for Central Niigata
 S* : for South Niigata
 W* : for West Niigata
 E* : for East Niigata
 "Sado-Kisen Line" : Niigata Sta.—Toki Messe—Sado Kisen Ferry Terminal

Minamiguchi Bus Terminal
 Transit bus operated by Niigata Kotsu
 Limousine bus for Niigata Airport
 C* / S* / W* / E*
 S7 : for Big Swan Stadium, Niigata Prefectural Baseball Stadium

References

External links

 JR East station information 

Railway stations in Japan opened in 1904
Railway stations in Niigata (city)
Shin'etsu Main Line
Jōetsu Shinkansen
Hakushin Line
Echigo Line